Ekaterina Valeryevna Iourieva (born June 11, 1983 in Chaykovsky, Perm Krai) is a Russian former biathlete and 2008 World Champion in the 15 km individual. She was disqualified for 10 years for doping violations.

Doping cases
On February 13, 2009 IBU announced Iourieva, as well as two other Russian team members, Olympic champion Albina Akhatova and world champion Dmitri Yaroshenko, tested positive for EPO during the World Cup in Östersund. Iourieva has been banned for two years.

In January 2014, she was reported to fail the doping test again. In February 2014, in her blog Iourieva announced her retirement. On July 14, 2014 she was formally disqualified for eight years, and all her results after December 23, 2013, were made void.

Career

2004/2005 

Made her World Cup debut in January 2005 in 15 km individual race at Antholtz-Anterselva finishing 43rd. In the other four races of the season scored points only once in the 7.5 km pursuit at Pokljuka.

2005/2006 

Did not compete at the World Cup.

2006/2007 

Starting with the World Championships finished in top-8 in 8 out of 11 races including first three podiums at Lahti and Oslo-Holmenkollen. Ranked 13th in the World Cup Total.

2007/2008 

Won her first World Cup race as well as collected full set of medals at the World Championships. After back-to-back 2nd-place finishes at Hochfilzen won 15 km individual race at Pokljuka. During the World Championships at Östersund shot flawlessly in both 15 km individual race claiming gold medal and 10 km pursuit earning silver medal, missed only two targets in 12.5 km mass start winning her third, bronze, medal of the Championships. Skipped two World Cup stages due to illness and fatigue. Finished 6th in the World Cup Total.

2008/2009 

Missed flower ceremony in only 3 out of 14 races. Won career first 7.5 km sprint at Oberhof and 12.5 km mass start at Antholz. Four more podium finishes : twice in a 10 km pursuit, once in each of 7.5 km sprint and 15 km individual races. Took part in all three relay races Russian team won this season. Going into 2009 World Championships Iourieva was the World Cup leader. However, she was stripped of all results of the season following revelation of the positive doping test taken in December at Östersund.

2010/2011 
Iourieva's disqualification term expired on December 4, 2010 and she revealed plans to return to the sport and to start her career in biathlon anew.

Results

World Championships

Winner - 2.

2nd place - 4.

3rd place - 3.

4th-8th places - 11.

Total races - 50.

References

External links

1983 births
Living people
People from Chaykovsky, Perm Krai
Russian female biathletes
Doping cases in biathlon
Biathlon World Championships medalists
Russian sportspeople in doping cases
Sportspeople from Perm Krai